Shunketsu Yūji (born July 13, 1976 as Yūji Ishide) is a former sumo wrestler from Misato, Saitama, Japan. The highest rank he reached was maegashira 12.

Career
Shunketsu made his professional debut in March 1992, alongside several future top division regulars such as Kyokushuzan, Wakanosato and Takanowaka.

Shunketsu used several different shikona during his career. He began using his own surname, Ishide. Upon promotion to sekitori status for the first time in January 2001 he was given the name Komahikari. However, after falling back to the unsalaried makushita division he reverted to Ishide. He retained this name until November 2005 when he became Shunketsu.

Restricted by diabetes and several injuries, Shunketsu took 78 tournaments from his professional debut to reach the top makuuchi division for the first time in March 2005, which at the time was the tenth slowest ever. He spent only five tournaments in makuuchi and only made kachi-koshi there once. He was ranked in the second jūryō division for 25 tournaments. He was the last sekitori from the now defunct Hanaregoma stable, which once produced yokozuna Onokuni.

After falling from the top division with a 4-11 record in January 2006 he rarely looked like returning, managing to win more than 8 bouts on only one occasion (in July 2006 when he slid to the bottom of the second division at jūryō 13 West and produced a 10-5 score). From November 2006 to May 2007 he managed four consecutive winning scores (eight wins each time), which took him up to jūryō 1 West, but he had five consecutive losing scores after that. After a 3-12 record in March 2008 at the rank of jūryō 11 West, and facing certain demotion to the third division, he announced his retirement.

He won one yusho or tournament title in the makushita division (a perfect 7-0 score in November 2000 which earned him automatic promotion to the jūryō division for the first time), and one in the jūryō division (a 12-3 score in November 2004).

Fighting style
Shunketsu was predominantly a yotsu-sumo wrestler, preferring grappling as opposed to pushing and thrusting techniques. His favoured grip on the opponent's mawashi was hidari-yotsu, with his right hand outside and left hand inside his opponent's arms. He also regularly employed henka, or sidestepping at the tachi-ai or initial charge.

Career record

See also
List of sumo tournament second division champions
Glossary of sumo terms
List of past sumo wrestlers

References

External links
 

1976 births
Living people
Japanese sumo wrestlers
Sumo people from Saitama Prefecture